Göran Bergort (born 14 February 1968) is a Swedish football manager and former player. He left IFK Norrköping when his contract ran out and was not renewed after the 2010 season.

During his playing career, Bergort played in Allsvenskan with IK Brage and IFK Norrköping and later in the Norwegian First Division with Bryne and IF Sylvia in Superettan before he ended his career in IK Brage.

References

External links
 

1968 births
Living people
Association football midfielders
Swedish footballers
IK Brage players
IFK Norrköping players
Bryne FK players
IF Sylvia players
Allsvenskan players
Norwegian First Division players
Superettan players
Swedish football managers
IFK Norrköping managers
Swedish expatriate football managers
Expatriate footballers in Norway
Swedish expatriate sportspeople in Norway
Swedish expatriate footballers